The Red Flag 2000-class ( Pulg'ŭn'gi-2000) is an electric locomotive built by the Kim Chong-t'ae Electric Locomotive Works for the Korean State Railway. They are used primarily for hauling non-express passenger trains on mainlines in North Korea; they are frequently seen on the P'yŏngŭi Line.

Internally, in terms of their electrical and mechanical components, the Red Flag 2000-class locomotives are based on the Red Flag 1-class, but with Bo-Bo wheel arrangement, riding on two-axle roller bearing bogies. The boxy body is of a hood-type design, with a cab at one end, external walkways around the long hood. They are generally operated with the long hood forward. Producing , they entered service in 1968. At least 43 were built, numbered 붉은기2001 to 붉은기2043, and most are painted in the standard light blue over dark blue livery, though a few have been noted in the newer two-tone light green over dark green scheme. One locomotive, number 2015, carries special titles on the sides reading Chŏngju Sŏnyon-ho (정주소년호, "Chŏngju Youth-class"). This is a feature shared with rebuilt locomotives of the Red Flag 1 and Red Flag 2 classes, but it is not known if this means this unit has been rebuilt.

References

Kim Chong-tae Works locomotives
3000 V DC locomotives
Railway locomotives introduced in 1968
Bo′Bo′ locomotives
Standard gauge locomotives of North Korea